There are only four Medical schools in Bahrain, two of which are part of public universities and another two of which are private universities.

Public medical schools

Private medical schools

Education in Bahrain
Bahrain